Hoover is a 2000 American drama film starring Ernest Borgnine as J. Edgar Hoover.

Plot

Cast
Ernest Borgnine as J. Edgar Hoover
Cartha DeLoach as himself

References

External links
 

American drama films
One-character films
2000 drama films
2000 films
2000s English-language films
2000s American films